Adam Boyes (born May 29, 1976) is a Canadian video game developer and executive. Boyes is the founder of Beefy Media and the former director of production at Capcom USA as well as the former Vice President of Publisher and Developer Relations  at Sony Interactive Entertainment (SIE).  After resigning from SIE, on July 26, 2016, he became the CEO of Iron Galaxy. Boyes left his position at SIE because he wanted to return to being involved with the creation of games.

Games worked on directly
 NBA Live 98 (1997, Genesis, Microsoft Windows, PS1, SEGA Saturn, SNES) — QA testing
 NBA Live 99 (1998, Microsoft Windows, Nintendo 64, PS1) — Tools & libraries, assistant lead
 MLB Slugfest Loaded (2004, PS2, Xbox) — Producer, music supervisor
 Blitz: The League (2005, PS2, Xbox, Xbox 360) — Producer, music supervisor
 Dark Void Zero (2010, iOS, Nintendo DS, Microsoft Windows) — Original game concept, revisionist history

Games worked on at Iron Galaxy Studios, LLC 

 Rumbleverse (2022, Microsoft Windows, PlayStation 4, PlayStation 5, Xbox One, Xbox Series X/S)

References

Video game businesspeople
Canadian technology chief executives
Sony Interactive Entertainment people
Video game producers
Living people
1976 births